The office of Surveyor General of Ireland was an appointed officer under the Dublin Castle administration of Ireland in the 17th and 18th centuries. The Surveyor General was typically responsible for the surveying, design and construction of civic works, and was often involved in overseeing the construction of military barracks and public buildings. Though Surveyors General were officially appointed by the Lord Lieutenant of Ireland, it was not unknown for the post to be "sold" by one holder to the next. For example, Arthur Jones-Nevill succeeded Arthur Dobbs in 1743, having paid £3,300 to secure the position. And despite being dismissed for mal-administration, Nevill was allowed to sell the post on to Thomas Eyre in 1752. Eyre was the last holder of the office, which was abolished in 1763.

List of Surveyors General of Ireland

Footnotes

References

Sources

Citations